The Wexford Carols is a 2014 album of traditional Irish carols by Caitríona O'Leary featuring guest singers Tom Jones, Rosanne Cash and Carolina Chocolate Drops singer Rhiannon Giddens produced by Joe Henry. The carol texts are mainly taken from the collections by Bishop Luke Wadding (1684) and Father William Devereux (1728). In the case of Devereux's carols, the tunes were not indicated, so O'Leary matched surviving folk tunes fitting the poems. The song "The Darkest Midnight" was learned from the 1982 album Darkest Midnight by singer Nóirín Ní Riain and the monks of Glenstal Abbey. The album went to No.1 on the Billboard World Albums Chart.

Track listing
 "Tell Shepherds" – Caitríona O’Leary
 "An Angel This Night" – Caitríona O’Leary
 "Jerusalem Our Happy Home" – Tom Jones (backing vocals Caitríona O’Leary & Rhiannon Giddens)
 "This Is Our Christmass Day" – Caitríona O’Leary
 "Now To Conclude Our Christmas Mirth" – Rhiannon Giddens (backing vocals Tom Jones & Caitríona O’Leary)
 "The Darkest Midnight In December" – Caitríona O’Leary
 "An Angel This Bright Midnight" – Rosanne Cash, Caitríona O’Leary, John Smith, Graham Hopkins
 "Behould Three Kings" – Rosanne Cash (backing vocals O’Leary, John Smith, Graham Hopkins)
 "The Angell Said To Joseph Mild" – Tom Jones (backing vocals O’Leary, Cash, Giddens)
 "A Virgin Queen In Bethlehem" – Caitríona O’Leary, Singer
 "Christmas Day Is Come" – Rhiannon Giddens & Caitríona O’Leary, Vocals
 "The Enniscorthy Christmas Carol" – Rosanne Cash, Rhiannon Giddens, Caitríona O’Leary, Tom Jones

References

Caitríona O'Leary albums
2014 Christmas albums
Celtic Christmas albums
Christmas albums by Irish artists
Rosanne Cash albums
Tom Jones (singer) albums